Hedwig Haß (28 July 1902 – 2 January 1992) was a German fencer. She competed in the women's individual foil event at the 1936 Summer Olympics.

References

1902 births
1992 deaths
German female fencers
Olympic fencers of Germany
Fencers at the 1936 Summer Olympics
Sportspeople from Frankfurt
20th-century German women